Glocalnet was a Swedish Internet service provider owned by Telenor.

It was merged into Bredbandsbolaget which was later merged into Telenor Sverige.

References

External links 
 Glocalnet

Internet service providers of Sweden
Telenor